SPARC-like protein 1 (SPARCL1 or SC1), also known as hevin (short for high endothelial venule protein), is a secreted protein with high structural similarity to SPARC. It interacts with the extracellular matrix to create intermediate states of cell adhesion. Due to its dynamic extracellular roles, being implicated in cancer metastasis and inflammation, it is considered a matricellular protein. In humans hevin is encoded by the SPARCL1 gene.

Interactions 
 CALY (calcyon)

See also 
Thrombospondin
Tenascin

References

Further reading 

 
 
 
 
 
 
 

Extracellular matrix proteins
Matricellular proteins
Cell adhesion proteins
Genes on human chromosome 4
EF-hand-containing proteins